Casbas de Huesca is a municipality located in the province of Huesca, Aragon, Spain. According to the 2004 census (INE), the municipality has a population of 296 inhabitants.

It comprises six villages: Casbas de Huesca itself, as well as Junzano, Labata, Panzano, Santa Cilia de Panzano and Sieso de Huesca. It includes the Romanesque Casbas Monastery, which ruled the area in the Middle Ages.

References

Municipalities in the Province of Huesca